The following events related to sociology occurred in the 1910s.

1910
Emily Greene Bloch's Our Slavic Fellow Citizens is published.
Lucien Lévy-Bruhl's How Natives Think is published.
Albion Small's The Meaning of the Social Sciences is published.
Franklin H. Giddings serves as president of the ASA.

Births
July 5: Robert K. Merton
August 11: George C. Homans

Deaths
August 26: William James

1911
Franz Boas' The Mind of Primitive Man is published.
Leonard Trelawny Hobhouse's Liberalism is published.
György Lukács' The Soul and Its Forms is published.
Robert Michels' Political Parties is published.
Werner Sombart's Die Juden und das Wirtschaftsleben is published.
Ernst Troeltsch's The Social Teaching of the Christian Churches is published.
H.G. Wells' The New Machiavelli is published.
Sidney Webb's and Beatrice Webb's Sphere of voluntary agencies in the prevention of destitution is published.

1912
Mary Coolidge's Why Women Are So is published.
Émile Durkheim's The Elementary Forms of Religious Life is published.
Maurice Halbwach's The Working class and standards of living, research on the needs in the hierarchy of contemporary industrial companies is published.
Max Scheler's Ressentiment is published.
Joseph Schumpeter's Theory of Economic Development is published.
Ernst Troeltsch's Protestantism and Progress is published.
Edward Alexander Westermarck's The Original Development of Moral Ideas is published.

1913
Sigmund Freud's Totem and Taboo is published.
Frederic Harrison's The Positive Evolution of Religion is published.
Leonard Trelawny Hobhouse's Development and Purpose: An Essay Towards a Philosophy of Evolution is published.
Rosa Luxemburg's The Accumulation of Capital is published.
Max Scheler's The Nature of Sympathy is published.
Jessie Taft's The Women's Movement from the Standpoint of Social Consciousness is published.

1914
Victor Branford's Interpretations and forecasts; a study of survivals and tendencies in contemporary society
Émile Durkheim's Pragmatism & the Question of Truth is published.
Frederic Harrison's The Meaning of war for Labour is published.
Ferdinand Tönnies' Gesetzmässigkeit in der Bewegung der Bevölkerung is published.
Thorstein Veblen's The Instinct of Workmanship and the State of the Industrial Arts is published.
Edward A. Ross serves as president of the ASA.
Turkish philosopher Ziya Gökalp set up the first department of sociology in the Ottoman Turkey, at Istanbul University, and founded the Turkish Sociology.

Births
May 22: Vance Packard

1915
James Bryce's Race Sentiment as a Factor in History is published.
Charlotte Perkins Gilman's Herland is published.
Alfred Louis Kroeber's The Eighteen Professions is published.

1916
Vladimir Ilyich Ulyanov Lenin's Imperialism, the Highest stage of Capitalism is published.
Vilfredo Pareto's The Mind and Society (it: Trattato di Sociologia Generale) is published.
Ferdinand de Saussure's Course in General Linguistics is published.
Max Weber's The Religion of China: Confucianism and Taoism is published.
George E. Vincent serves as president of the American Sociological Association.

Births
August 28: C. Wright Mills

1917
Alfred Louis Kroeber's The Superorganic is published.
Vladimir Ilyich Ulyanov Lenin's State and Revolution is published.
Ferdinand Tönnies' The German State and The English State is published.
Max Weber's The Religion of India: The Sociology of Hinduism and Buddhism is published.

1918
Charles Cooley's Social Association is published.
Frederic Harrison's On Society is published.
Karl Kautsky's The Dictatorship of the Proletariat is published.
Benjamin Seebohm Rowntree's The Human Needs of Labour is published.
W. I. Thomas and Florian Znaniecki's The Polish Peasant in Europe and America is published

Births
October 16: Louis Althusser

1919
Sir Patrick Geddes' Our Social Inheritance is published.
Frederic Harrison's On Jurisprudence and the Conflict of Laws is published.
Johan Huizinga's The Waning of Middle Ages is published.
Pitirim Sorokin's System of Sociology is published.
Beatrice Webb's and Sidney Webb's History of Trade Unionism is published.
Max Weber's Ancient Judaism is published.
Florian Znaniecki's Cultural Reality is published.
Frank W. Blackmar serves as president of the ASA.

Births
May 10: Daniel Bell
July 11: Antonina Kłoskowska

Deaths
January 15: Rosa Luxemburg

Sociology
Sociology timelines